Lucero Suárez (born December 3, 1963 in Mérida, Yucatán, México) is a Mexican producer and screenwriter.

Biography
Lucero Suárez began her career as a production manager in various soap operas with the producer Carlos Téllez including the soap opera Cuna de lobos. As executive producer, began in 1996 with the telenovela "Para toda la vida", based on the Chilean soap opera La madrastra. In 1998, she made the soap opera Rencor apasionado based on a radionovela of Hilda Morales Allois.

In 2001, she produced El noveno mandamiento also based on a radionovela of René Allouis. In 2001, she produced Amar otra vez written by Pablo Serra and Erika Johanson. In 2005, she produced the children's soap opera Pablo and Andrea, the last children soap opera in Televisa, with an original story of Lorena Salazar, Areli Caraza and Alejandro Cicchitti.

In 2006-2007, she returned to produce a soap opera of Pablo Serra and Erika Johanson, this time including the co-producer of the Miami Fonovideo Las Dos Caras de Ana. In 2008, she produced again with Pablo Serra and Erika Johanson the soap opera Querida Enemiga. In 2010, she produced the soap opera Zacatillo, un lugar en tu corazón; after 10 years of waiting for it to be released, it finally succeeded and it was a tribute to the original writer of the story, Pedro Pablo Quintanilla González.

In 2011-2012, she produced the soap opera Amorcito corazón. In 2013, she produced the soap opera De que te quiero, te quiero, and in 2015, Suárez produced the soap opera La Vecina.

In 2017, she produced the soap opera "Enamorándome de Ramón". In 2019, she produced the soap opera "Ringo la pelea de su vida" and in 2020, produced "Te doy la vida". All these soap operas have been a success for being in the first places in audience both in México and in the United States.

Filmography

Awards and nominations

Premios TVyNovelas

Premios Califa de Oro 2010

Presea Luminaria de Oro 2019
 For your job in the production of: Ringo para Lucero Suárez

Premio Nacional Universitario 2020

 For your job in the TV Mexican

References

External links

1963 births
Living people
Mexican telenovela producers
Mexican screenwriters
Mexican women screenwriters
People from Mérida, Yucatán
Women television producers